Melody Club is a Swedish band from Växjö formed in January 2000. Their breakthrough came in 2002 with the song Palace Station, which was also a big success in Germany. The band has frequent radio airplay in Sweden, Germany, Japan, Norway and Denmark.

Melody Club's style can be described as a blend of synthpop and glam rock. The single "Fever Fever" is included on the soundtrack of the football video game by EA Sports, FIFA 08. On 22 April 2009, they released their fifth and first self-produced album, "Goodbye to Romance". The first single from the album was called "Girls Don't Always Wanna Have Fun"—a possible reference to Cyndi Lauper's "Girls Just Wanna Have Fun".

In 2010 Andy A left the group in protest against the group's participation in Eurovision and was replaced with the original drummer Richard Ankers.

Melodifestivalen 2011 
Melody Club participated in Melodifestivalen 2011, the Swedish selection for the Eurovision Song Contest 2011. They competed in the fourth semi-final on 26 February 2011 in Malmö Arena, Malmö with the song "The Hunter", finishing in 7th place.

Band members
 Kristofer Östergren - vocals
 Erik Stenemo - guitar
 Jon Bordon - synthesizer
 Niklas Stenemo - bass guitar
 Richard Ankers - drums

Discography

Albums

Compilation albums

Singles

References

External links

 Official Site

Musical groups established in 2000
Swedish musical groups
Culture in Växjö
2000 establishments in Sweden
Melodifestivalen contestants of 2011